Albert Owens was an American Negro league pitcher in the 1930s.

Owens played for the Nashville Elite Giants in 1930. In three recorded appearances on the mound, he posted a 6.61 ERA over 16.1 innings.

References

External links
 and Seamheads

Year of birth missing
Year of death missing
Place of birth missing
Place of death missing
Nashville Elite Giants players
Baseball pitchers